Michael Maurer may refer to:

 Michael Maurer (writer), writer, actor, and cinematographer 
 Michel Maurer aka Michael Maurer (born 1904), Luxembourgian boxer